The 1990 United States House of Representatives elections was an election for the United States House of Representatives on November 6, 1990, to elect members to serve in the 102nd United States Congress. They occurred in the middle of President George H. W. Bush's term. As in most midterm elections, the President's Republican Party lost seats to the Democratic Party, slightly increasing the Democratic majority in the chamber. It was a rare instance, however, in which both major parties lost votes to third parties such as the Libertarian Party as well as independent candidates.

, this was the last time a party held 60 percent of the seats in the House.

Special elections 

Elections are listed by date and district.

Election summaries 

Source: Election Statistics – Office of the Clerk

Incumbents who lost re-election

Democrats 
 : Douglas H. Bosco
 : Jim Bates
 : Roy Dyson
 : James M. Clarke
 : Doug Walgren
 : Robert Kastenmeier

Republicans 
 : Chip Pashayan
 : James W. Grant
 : John P. Hiler
 : Arlan Stangeland
 : Jack Buechner
 : Charles Douglas III
 : Denny Smith
 : Peter Plympton Smith
 : Stanford Parris

Retirements 

There were a total of 26 Representatives not seeking re-election: 10 Democrats and 16 Republicans.

Democrats 
 : Ronnie Flippo
 : Augustus Hawkins
 : Bruce Morrison
 : Bill Nelson
 : Lindy Boggs
 : Joseph E. Brennan
 : George Crockett Jr.
 : Tom Luken
 : Wes Watkins
 : Marvin Leath

Republicans 
 : Tommy F. Robinson
 : Norman D. Shumway
 : Hank Brown
 : John G. Rowland
 : Pat Saiki
 : Larry Craig
 : Lynn Morley Martin
 : Tom Tauke
 : Bob Whittaker
 : Bill Schuette
 : Bill Frenzel
 : Virginia D. Smith
 : Bob Smith
 : Jim Courter
 : Mike DeWine
 : Claudine Schneider

Alabama

Alaska

Arizona

Arkansas

California

Colorado

Connecticut

Delaware

Florida

Georgia

Hawaii

Idaho

Illinois

Indiana

Iowa

Kansas

Kentucky

Louisiana

Maine

Maryland

Massachusetts

Michigan

Minnesota

Mississippi

Missouri

Montana

Nebraska

Nevada

New Hampshire

New Jersey

New Mexico

New York

North Carolina

North Dakota

Ohio

Oklahoma

Oregon

Pennsylvania

Rhode Island

South Carolina

South Dakota

Tennessee

Texas

Utah

Vermont

Virginia

Washington

West Virginia

Wisconsin

Wyoming

Non-voting delegates

See also 
 1990 United States elections
 1990 United States gubernatorial elections
 1990 United States Senate elections
 101st United States Congress
 102nd United States Congress

Notes

References